The men's 1 mile event at the 1938 British Empire Games was held on 10 and 12 February at the Sydney Cricket Ground in Sydney, Australia.

Medalists

Results

Heats
Qualification: First 4 in each heat (Q) qualify directly for the final.

Final

References

Athletics at the 1938 British Empire Games
1938